Kyainseikgyi is a town in Kayin State, Myanmar, located on the eastern side of the Zami River. It is the administrative center of the Kyain Seikgyi Township.

References

External links
 "Kya-in Seikkyi Map — Satellite Images of Kya-in Seikkyi" Maplandia World Gazetteer

Township capitals of Myanmar
Populated places in Kayin State